John Lavelle (born November 23, 1981) is an American stage, film, television actor, and playwright who is perhaps best known for his role as Benjamin Braddock in John Reid's 2002 Broadway adaptation of The Graduate, where he starred opposite Lorraine Bracco.
and for his portrayal of Roy Reed in the film Selma. He is the author of several plays including Sinner's Laundry and Inhalation. He won a Drama Desk Award for his work in The Royale at the Lincoln Center Theatre.

Early life
The Brooklyn native graduated from Monsignor Farrell High School in Staten Island, New York. At Monsignor Farrell, Lavelle also became the first anchor of their student-run television station, WFBN. After high school Lavelle attended the Tisch School of the Arts at New York University, graduating in 2004 with a Bachelor of Fine Arts in Drama. He is a performer at the Upright Citizen's Brigade and a member of IAMA Theatre Company in Los Angeles.

Filmography

Film

Television

Video games

References

External links 

Living people
1981 births
American male film actors
American male soap opera actors
American male stage actors
American male television actors
American male voice actors
American male video game actors
Tisch School of the Arts alumni
Male actors from New York City
People from Staten Island
People from Brooklyn
21st-century American male actors
Monsignor Farrell High School alumni